Brady James Ballew (born July 3, 1992) is a retired American professional soccer player who played as a midfielder.

Career

Early career
A 2010 graduate of Marysville-Pilchuck High school and a four-year varsity starter, Ballew helped lead the Tomahawks to their first state appearance since 1985 and a fourth-place finish his junior year. During his senior year he was awarded Seattle Times All-Area and WESCO North MVP and leading goal scorer. Later was awarded first team all-state, second team all-state, two-time all-area first team, two-time first team All-Wesco and two-time honorable mention.

Ballew played college soccer at Seattle University between 2010 and 2014. He was the captain for 3 years leading his team to an NCAA tournament appearance his senior year. Ballew was named Tournament MVP and to the All-Tournament Team of Aaron Olitsky Memorial Classic in Charleston, S.C. his senior year.

Ballew also appeared for USL PDL club Puget Sound Gunners between 2011 and 2014.

Professional
Ballew signed with United Soccer League club Tulsa Roughnecks in March 2015. He was a finalist for the USL Rookie of the Year in 2015. He placed first among fan voting. Since retiring from professional soccer he has gone on to open a cafe and hot yoga studio in downtown Tulsa. His band, MORE&MORE is set to release new music in 2022.

References

External links 
 Tulsa Roughnecks profile

1992 births
Living people
American soccer players
Seattle Redhawks men's soccer players
Puget Sound Gunners FC players
FC Tulsa players
Association football midfielders
Soccer players from Washington (state)
USL League Two players
USL Championship players
Sportspeople from Everett, Washington
People from Marysville, Washington